Chevrières may refer to the following communes in France:

 Chevrières, Isère, in the Isère department
 Chevrières, Loire, in the Loire department
 Chevrières, Oise, in the Oise department
 Chevagny-les-Chevrières, in the Saône-et-Loire department
 Novy-Chevrières, in the Ardennes department